Cathedral of the Holy Mother of God, also known as the Our Lady of Seven Wounds, is a 19th-century church in Gyumri, Armenia. Occupying the northern side of the Vartanants Square, the cathedral is the seat of the Diocese of Shirak of the Armenian Apostolic Church. The church was constructed between 1873 and 1884.

Architecture
The church of the Holy Mother of God belongs to the Cruciform style of the Armenian churches with an external rectangular shape. The belfry is located at the top of the main entrance on the western side of the building. The church is topped with a large dome at the center surrounded with 2 minor domes. Unlike other Armenian churches, the altar at the Holy Mother of God is unique for its multi-iconic decoration.

The church remained active during the Soviet years.

After the 1988 Armenian earthquake, the two minor domes fell down and they were replaced with new ones. The fallen domes are currently placed in the church yard.

Gallery

References

External links
About Saint Astvatsatsin Church in Gyumri

Buildings and structures in Gyumri
Churches completed in 1884
Tourist attractions in Shirak Province
Gyumri